HMS Wakeful was a W-class destroyer of the Royal Navy launched in 1943.  She saw service during the Second World War and was later converted into a Type 15 fast anti-submarine frigate.  She was sold for scrap in 1971.

Construction
HMS Wakeful was a W-class destroyer ordered from Fairfield Shipbuilding and Engineering Company, Govan, Glasgow on 3 December 1941 as part of the 9th Emergency Flotilla. She became the second ship of the name, the first being an Admiralty W-class destroyer sunk by a German E-Boat off Dunkirk in 1940 during Operation Dynamo, the evacuation from Dunkirk.

Service history

Second World War
Wakeful joined the Home Fleet on 17 February 1944 for sea trials and working up, before entering active service in March and forming part of the 27th Destroyer Flotilla when more ships of the class became available. In May 1944 Wakeful served as an escort during air attacks on German shipping off Narvik and Stadlandet, Norway as part of the 27th Destroyer Flotilla.

Throughout June and July 1944 she was refitted for redeployment to the Eastern Fleet remaining with the 27th Destroyer Flotilla for operations in the Indian Ocean based at Trincomalee.  In October 1944 the Eastern Fleet initiated diversionary air attacks on the Nicobar Islands during the US amphibious assault of Leyte.  In November 1944 Wakeful, with the remainder of the Flotilla, was transferred to the British Pacific Fleet upon its formation.

In January 1945 she took part in Operation Meridian One as an escort during air attacks on refineries at Pladjoe, and then took part in Operation Meridian Two as an escort during air raids on Soengi-Gerong near Palembang.  In March 1945 the British Pacific Fleet joined Admiral Raymond Spruance's United States Fifth Fleet, before joining Admiral William Halsey's United States Third Fleet in May 1945. During August 1945 Wakeful was on escort duties during the Royal Navy and United States Navy's air raids on Hokkaido and North Honshū.  The destroyer was in Tokyo Bay during the formal surrender and was available to support the occupation of Japan, remaining in Japanese waters to help with the repatriation of allied nationals before departing for Sydney.  She returned to the UK in December 1945, having received the battle honours 'North Sea 1944' and 'East Indies 1944' for her wartime service.

Post war
Between 1948 and 1950 her captain was Commander Royston Wright.

Wakeful was used as a Boys Training ship until she was converted to a Type 15 anti-submarine warfare frigate by Scotts Shipbuilding and Engineering Company between 1951 and 1953. In 1953 she took part in the Fleet Review to celebrate the Coronation of Queen Elizabeth II.

She was assigned the new pennant number F159 and served in the Mediterranean as a part of the 5th Frigate Squadron until 1957. During this time she took part in Operation Musketeer, the Anglo-French assault on Port Said to take control of the Suez Canal. On 25 February 1960 she was used for the burial at sea of Edwina Mountbatten, Countess Mountbatten of Burma off the coast of Portsmouth. On 25 August 1960, the destroyer  was carrying out steam trials while moored alongside the minelayer  at Portsmouth, when steam was let into the ship's turbines, driving the ship forward and breaking Apollos mooring lines. Apollo then collided with Wakeful, which also broke free from her moorings and struck the caisson at the entrance to a dock. Apollos stem was damaged, while Wakeful suffered buckled plates from the impact by Apollo and a badly damaged bow from the collision with the caisson.

In April 1964 she was part of the 2nd Frigate Squadron and took part in 'Navy Days' in Portsmouth during that year. In the same year Wakeful was used for the filming of the opening scenes of The Bedford Incident, including Sidney Poitier's initial flypast and landing from a Whirlwind helicopter, when her pennant number F159 is clearly visible. (Some interior scenes were filmed in her sister Type 15 frigate .)

Between 1966 and 1967 she was fitted with experimental satellite communication equipment and stabilisers for trials. In 1968 she took part in 'Navy Days' at Portsmouth Dockyard and at this time was part of the 2nd Frigate Squadron. On 31 October 1967 she escorted the RMS Queen Mary out of Southampton on her final voyage to Long Beach for retirement.
In August 1968 she took part in the Western Fleet Review that sailed 50 ships in a review of the fleet carried out by the newly promoted Admiral of the Fleet Sir Varyl Begg on his retirement.

 HMS Wakeful (Commanded by Lt.Cdr. David Whitehead) also went up the Ouistreham Canal for the 25th Anniversary of D Day in June 1969.

Decommissioning and disposal
In 1970 Wakeful was put on the Disposal List, and on 26 February left Portsmouth for de-equipping. She was sold to Thos. W. Ward for scrapping on 10 July 1971 and arrived in tow at Inverkeithing for demolition on 5 July that year.

Affiliations

Official affiliation

 Darwen, Lancashire

Notes

References

External links
 HMS Wakeful at uboat.net
 HMS Wakeful at naval-history.net

 

W and Z-class destroyers
Ships built on the River Clyde
1943 ships
World War II destroyers of the United Kingdom
Cold War destroyers of the United Kingdom
Type 15 frigates of the Royal Navy
Cold War frigates of the United Kingdom